The 1961–62 Loyola Ramblers men's basketball team represented Loyola University Chicago. The head coach was George Ireland. The Ramblers went 23–4 and earned a third place finish in the National Invitation Tournament (NIT).

Jerry Harkness led the team in scoring with a total of 567 points, making for an average of 21.0 points per game. Les Hunter led in field goal percentage at 49.3%, going 137 for 238 on the season. Vic Rouse led the team in rebounding, making 294 rebounds for a per-game average of 11.3, and in free throw percentage, sinking 85 out of 109 throws for 78.0% on the season. The team averaged 90.2 points per game, the fourth-highest scoring average in Loyola-Chicago history

Roster 

Sources: Sports-Reference, Loyola yearbook

Schedule

|-
!colspan=8 style=| National Invitation Tournament

Rankings

References

External links

 1961–62 Loyola Ramblers statistics at Sports Reference

1961–62
1961–62 NCAA University Division men's basketball independents season
1961 in sports in Illinois
1962 in sports in Illinois
1962 National Invitation Tournament participants